Joseph Patrick Lumley (born 15 February 1995) is an English professional footballer who plays as a goalkeeper for Reading on loan from Middlesbrough.

Career

Tottenham Hotspur 
As a ten-year-old, Lumley was scouted by Tottenham Hotspur while playing for local junior side Buckhurst Hill; Tottenham also signed his brother Billy. Lumley played alongside the likes of Harry Winks and looked up to Harry Kane during his time at Tottenham Hotspur. On 30 June 2010, Lumley was released by Tottenham at the age of 16 having not being offered a full time scholarship.

Queens Park Rangers
Within the 2010 summer transfer window, Lumley signed for London neighbours Queens Park Rangers.

On 15 May 2013, Lumley was part of the QPR under-18s who won the Professional Development League Two with a 1-0 win over Huddersfield Town. Two weeks later, Lumley signed his first professional contract moving up from scholarship terms on a one-year deal.

On 16 June 2014, Lumley signed a one-year contract extension with QPR meaning he would remain until the summer of 2015. During a pre-season tour of Germany before the 2014-15 season, Lumley was drafted into the squad after an injury to goalkeeper Brian Murphy. Lumley played the second 45 minutes in a 1-0 win against Rot-Weiß Erfurt and first-choice keeper Rob Green admitted he was 'really pleased' to see Lumley doing well.

On 15 May 2015, Lumley signed a new two-year contract keeping him until summer of 2017.

Due to a goalkeeper injury crisis, on 9 January 2016, Lumley made his Queens Park Rangers debut in the FA Cup against Nottingham Forest at the City Ground, which resulted in a 1–0 defeat. On 12 January 2016, Lumley then went on to make his Championship debut in a 1–1 draw with Blackburn Rovers, playing the full 90 minutes.

On 17 July 2018, Lumley signed a three-year deal committing until the summer of 2021.

After the departure of Alex Smithies to Cardiff City at the end of the 2017-18 season, Lumley became the Rangers first choice keeper, keeping his first QPR clean sheet against Wigan Athletic in a 1-0 win. In October 2018, he won Supporters Player of the Month as he helped collect 13 points which was the largest tally out of all teams in the Championship that month. He made 46 appearances in all competitions and keeping 16 clean sheets in the 2018-19 season.

In the 2019-20 season, he competed for the place with newly signed Liam Kelly which limited his appearances to 28 for the season. He ended the Championship restart with six consecutive starts.

On 19 November 2019, Lumley became an ambassador for the QPR Trust working across different areas including sports participation, education, health, homelessness and food poverty.

Loan spells

Bishop's Stortford
On 7 March 2014, Lumley joined Bishop's Stortford on a one-month loan deal, in order to gain some first-team experience. On 8 March 2014, Lumley made his Bishop's Stortford debut in a 1–1 draw against Tonbridge Angels. Lumley went on to make three more appearances before returning to Queens Park Rangers.

Accrington Stanley

On 23 August 2014, Lumley signed on a month-long youth loan for Accrington Stanley. Lumley made his Football League debut for Accrington Stanley against Bury on 30 August 2014.

Morecambe

On 7 November 2014, Lumley joined League Two side Morecambe on a one-month loan deal. After only making one appearance for Morecambe in a 1–0 defeat to Dover Athletic in the FA Cup, Lumley returned to Queens Park Rangers.

Stevenage

On 7 October 2015, Lumley joined Stevenage on a one-month loan. After failing to make a single appearance at Stevenage, Lumley returned to Loftus Road.

Bristol Rovers
On 18 January 2017, Lumley joined League One side Bristol Rovers on loan until the end of the 2016/17 season. Lumley made his debut for the club on 21 January 2017 in a 3–1 defeat to Walsall. He followed the defeat at Walsall with two clean sheets in a 1–0 victory over Swindon Town and a 0–0 draw away at Rochdale. The following week he made a man of the match performance in a 1–1 draw against Bradford City making saves to keep out Tony McMahon, Charlie Wyke and Nathaniel Knight-Percival. Lumley played the final game of his loan spell, during which he kept eight clean sheets, in a 4–3 defeat to Millwall on 30 April 2017.

Blackpool

On 8 January 2018 he moved to League One side Blackpool on loan until the end of the season, but was recalled by QPR on 26 April 2018 following an injury to team-mate Matt Ingram. He made his Blackpool debut in a 0-0 draw against Bristol Rovers. Lumley kept a total of nine clean sheets during his time at the Tangerines.

Gillingham 
On 30 October 2020 he signed for League One side Gillingham on an emergency loan deal following an injury to the Kent side's first choice goalkeeper Jack Bonham. He made two appearances for the club before heading back to QPR.

Doncaster Rovers
On 20 November 2020, Lumley signed for League One side Doncaster Rovers on an emergency seven-day loan deal. During his first week, Lumley helped Doncaster earn 4 points which included a draw with Sunderland and a win against Blackpool. His loan was then extended by a further seven days. On 4 December, it was then extended by a further week. The loan deal was then extended by another week. On 18 December 2020, it was extended by another seven days. On 5 January 2021, it was confirmed that the loan spell had ended and that Lumley had returned to Queens Park Rangers.

Middlesbrough
At the end of the 2020–21 season, Lumley was offered a new contract. However he turned this down in search for first-team football and on 19 May 2021, it was announced that he would join fellow Championship side Middlesbrough on a two-year deal, with an option of a further year.

Reading (loan)
On 19 June 2022, Lumley joined Reading on a season-long loan deal.

Personal life 
As a child, Lumley idolised keeper Shay Given especially during his days at Newcastle United. Lumley would spend hours imitating Given's saves in his back garden with brother Billy Lumley. His brother now lives in Australia and runs his own goalkeeper academy.

Career statistics

References

External links

1995 births
Living people
Sportspeople from Harlow
English footballers
Association football goalkeepers
Accrington Stanley F.C. players
Bishop's Stortford F.C. players
Bristol Rovers F.C. players
Morecambe F.C. players
Queens Park Rangers F.C. players
Stevenage F.C. players
Blackpool F.C. players
Gillingham F.C. players
Doncaster Rovers F.C. players
Middlesbrough F.C. players
Reading F.C. players
National League (English football) players
English Football League players